Salvinia, a genus in the family Salviniaceae, is a floating fern named in honor of Anton Maria Salvini, a 17th-century Italian scientist.  Watermoss is a common name for Salvinia. The genus was published in 1754 by Jean-François Séguier, in his description of the plants found round Verona, Plantae Veronenses Twelve species are recognized, at least three of which (S. molesta, S. herzogii, and S. minima) are believed to be hybrids, in part because their sporangia are found to be empty.

Salvinia is related to the other water ferns, including the mosquito fern Azolla. Recent sources include both Azolla and Salvinia in Salviniaceae, although each genus was formerly given its own family.

Salvinia, like the other ferns in order Salviniales, are heterosporous, producing spores of differing sizes.  However, leaf development in Salvinia is unique. The upper side of the floating leaf, which appears to face the stem axis, is morphologically abaxial.

Salvinia cucullata is one of just two fern species for which a reference genome has been published.

Description
Small, floating aquatics with creeping stems, branched, bearing hairs on the leaf surface papillae but no true roots. Leaves are in trimerous whorls, with two leaves green, sessile or short-petioled, flat, entire and floating, and one leaf finely dissected, petiolate, rootlike and pendent. Submerged leaves bearing sori that are surrounded by basifixed membranous indusia (sporocarps).

They bear sporocarps of two types, either megasporangia that are few in number (approximately 10), each with single megaspore, or many microsporangia, each with 64 microspores. Spores are of two kinds and sizes, both globose, trilete. Megagametophytes and microgametophytes protruding through sporangium wall; megagametophytes floating on water surface with archegonia directed downward; microgametophytes remaining fixed to sporangium wall.

The small, hairlike growths, known as trichomes or microgametical follicles, are not known to have any productive function, and are currently a biological mystery.

Phylogeny
Phylogeny of Salvinia

Other species include:
 S. auriculata Aublet
 S. biloba Raddi
 S. ×delasotae Miranda & Schwartsburd 2019 {Salvinia sprucei × Salvinia minima}
 S. hastata Desvaux
 S. martynii Kopp
 S. nuriana de la Sota
 S. nymphellula Desvaux
 S. sprucei Kuhn

Evolutionary history
The geography of Salvinia fossil material suggests members of the genus may have been broadly distributed during the Tertiary.

Distribution
Distribution is mostly tropical, in North America, Mexico, West Indies, Central America, South America, Eurasia and Africa, including Madagascar, South Borneo, Asia.

Economic impacts
Giant salvinia (Salvinia molesta) is a commonly introduced invasive weed in warm climates, but is native to South America. It grows rapidly, up to two times its dry weight in 2-1/2 days, and forms dense mats over still waters. A tiny weevil, Cyrtobagous salviniae, has been used successfully to biologically control giant salvinia.

One proposed use takes advantage of the hydrophobic trichomes, which do not repel oil. This makes them candidates for mopping up oil spills, as they become saturated with oil in thirty seconds. S. molesta trichomes served as a model for a similarly hydrophobic synthetic polycarbonate.

Salvinia effect
The salvinia effect describes the stabilization of an air layer upon a submerged hydrophobic (water repellent) surface by hydrophilic (water loving) pins. This physic-chemical phenomenon was discovered on the floating fern Salvinia molesta by the botanist Wilhelm Barthlott (Universität Bonn) while working on the Lotus effect and was described in cooperation with the physicist Thomas Schimmel (Karlsruher Institut für Technologie), fluid mechanist Alfred Leder (Universität Rostock) and their colleagues in 2010.

References

Sources
 USDA
 Salvinia minima in Flora of North America
 S. molesta as pest

Salviniales
Aquatic plants
Fern genera